The 1960 Tangerine Bowl may refer to:

 1960 Tangerine Bowl (January) - January 1, 1960, game between the Middle Tennessee Blue Raiders and the 
 1960 Tangerine Bowl (December) - December 30, 1960, game between The Citadel Bulldogs and the